USS Campbell may refer to more than one United States Navy ship

 , a destroyer escort cancelled in 1944
 , a destroyer escort in commission from 1943 to 1946
 , a destroyer escort in commission from 1944 to 1946